Byerly House, also known as the Best House, is a historic home located in Upper Burrell Township, Westmoreland County, Pennsylvania.  The main section was built in 1842, with a rear ell dated to the 1830s.  The main section is a two-story, brick dwelling, five bays wide and on a stone foundation.  It has a gable roof and three chimneys.  It has a one-story, rear ell consisting of two rooms.  It is a vernacular dwelling with Post Colonial and Greek Revival design elements.

It was added to the National Register of Historic Places in 1985.

References

Houses on the National Register of Historic Places in Pennsylvania
Greek Revival houses in Pennsylvania
Houses completed in 1842
Houses in Westmoreland County, Pennsylvania
National Register of Historic Places in Westmoreland County, Pennsylvania